3 Monkeys is a 2020 Indian Telugu-language comedy drama film written and directed by Anil Kumar G, produced by G. Nagesh under the banner Orugallu Cine Creations. The story revolves around three friends getting into trouble after meeting character Sunny Leone played by Karunya Chowdary. Consequences will get worse with Shatru character played by Kautilya.

Plot 
The plot revolves around three friends - Santhosh, Phani and Anand. Phani is an aspiring film director, Santhosh works in marketing while Anand is a software engineer. One day, they come across Sunny Leone, who has a rare heart disease which leaves her temporarily comatose. During one of such incident, the trio think that she should be buried as they are thinking that she is dead. They encounter police as they learn that a murder has been committed in the same locality. A corrupt police officer C.I. Sathru learns about this and blackmails them. What is the history between the police officer and the friends? What happens next forms the crux of the story.

Cast
 Sudigali Sudheer as Santhosh
 Getup Srinu as Phani
 Ram Prasad as Anand
 Karunya Chowdary as Sunny Leone
 Kautilya as C.I. Sathru
 Shakalaka Shankar as Doctor Bali

Soundtrack

Reception 
The movie received mixed reviews.Times of India has given 1.5 out of 5 mentioning " An extension of idiotic comedy skits seen on television".

References

2020 comedy-drama films
2020s Telugu-language films
Indian comedy-drama films
2020 films